Dweezil & Lisa was a 2004 Food Network television series presented by rock musicians and erstwhile couple Dweezil Zappa and Lisa Loeb. The duo traveled around America, sampling local music and cuisine.

The show originated from pie cooking demos that Loeb was incorporating into some of her concerts in support of her 2002 album, Cake and Pie. The pair approached Food Network to highlight these activities on a segment of one of its existing shows, but the network instead offered them an entire television series.

In the opening episode (January 16, 2004) they visited Atlanta, Georgia and visit places like Gladys Knight & Ron Winans' Chicken & Waffles, a soul food restaurant, and the Varsity, America's largest drive-in restaurant.  New York Post reviewer Adam Buckman described the show as "a heaping helping of cutie-pie", and "[s]omewhere between spicy and bland". Barbara Hooks of The Age commented that the show "draws a long bow, cutting awkwardly from Dweezil playing charity golf in Chicago to Lisa on a  crawl of the windy city."

References

Food Network original programming
2000s American reality television series
2004 American television series debuts
2004 American television series endings
Food travelogue television series
Lisa Loeb